Elections in the Republic of India in 1996 included the 1996 Indian general election, elections to eight state legislative assemblies and to seats in the Rajya Sabha.

General Elections

Legislative Assembly elections

Assam

Haryana

|- align=center
!style="background-color:#E9E9E9" class="unsortable"|
!style="background-color:#E9E9E9" align=center|Political Party
!style="background-color:#E9E9E9" |No. of candidates
!style="background-color:#E9E9E9" |No. of elected
!style="background-color:#E9E9E9" |Number of Votes
!style="background-color:#E9E9E9" |% of Votes
|-
| 
|align="left"|Haryana Vikas Party
||65		
||33
||17,16,572
||22.7%
|-
| 
|align="left"|Samta Party
||89	
||24
||15,57,914
||20.6%
|-
| 
|align="left"|Bharatiya Janata Party
||25
||11
||6,72,558
||8.9%
|-
| 
|align="left"|Independent
||2022
||10
||11,73,533
||15.5%
|-
| 
|align="left"|Indian National Congress
||90	
||9
||15,76,882
||20.8%
|-
| 
|align="left"|All India Indira Congress (Tiwari)
||62		
||3
||2,42,638
||3.2%
|-
|}

Jammu and Kashmir

The National Conference won 57 out of 86 seats. The BSP contested first time on 29 seats in the state and won 4 seats. The BJP rose from two seats in 1987 to 8 seats.

Kerala

Puducherry

Tamil Nadu

Uttar Pradesh

Source:

West Bengal

Rajya Sabha

References

External links
 

1996 elections in India
India
1996 in India
Elections in India by year